Anna Lisbeth Christina Palme (née Beck-Friis; 14 March 1931 – 18 October 2018) was a Swedish children's psychologist, UNICEF chairwoman and the wife of Swedish prime minister Olof Palme, until his assassination in 1986.

Biography

Early life and studies
Anna Lisbeth Christina Beck-Friis was born to civil engineer and baron Christian Beck-Friis and his wife Anna-Lisa Beck-Friis (née Bolling). After graduating from the Nya Elementarskolan för flickor (New Elementary School for Girls) in Stockholm in 1950, she studied at Stockholm University, graduating in the summer of 1955.

Career
Palme worked as a children's psychologist and was during a period of time employed at Stockholm County Council, and later at the social department for Stockholm county.

She was the chairman of the Swedish UNICEF committee between 1987 and 1999 and in that role campaigned against the sexual exploitation of children. She became the international chairwoman for UNICEF between 1990 and 1991.

Palme was one of the champions for the Children's convention (Barnkonventionen) which was later established. She was a member of the Organisation of African Unity committee of investigation into the Rwandan genocide which reported its findings in 2000.

Personal life
Lisbeth married politician Olof Palme on 9 June 1956. He later became Sweden's prime minister; firstly between 1969 and 1976, and again between 1982 and 1986. Together they had three sons: Joakim, Mårten and Mattias. The couple had been married for almost 30 years when Olof Palme was assassinated in 1986.

Lisbeth Palme was an eyewitness to the murder of her husband on the night of 28 February 1986. During the trial, she pointed out Christer Pettersson as being the perpetrator of the killing. According to a detective present, she also made remarks that it was evident that Pettersson was an alcoholic. The comments were interpreted by some as if she had been informed that the suspect was an alcoholic and a drug addict. Several experts have, over the years, pointed towards the possibility that Lisbeth Palme may have identified the wrong man.

Death
Palme died on 18 October 2018, after suffering from an unspecified illness for some time. She was 87.

References

Further reading

External links 

20th-century Swedish women
21st-century Swedish women
1931 births
2018 deaths
Chairmen and Presidents of UNICEF
Child psychologists
Lisbeth
Politicians from Stockholm
Sommar (radio program) hosts
Spouses of prime ministers of Sweden
Swedish nobility
Swedish officials of the United Nations
Swedish psychologists
Swedish social democrats
Swedish women psychologists